Three Rivers is a city in Live Oak County, Texas, United States. The population was 1,848 at the 2010 census.

History

Mrs. Annie T. Hamilton of Cuero owned a tract of land in the Brush Country where Three Rivers now sits.  At the urging of Mrs. Hamilton, Charles R. Tips came to the Brush Country. In 1913, Mrs. Hamilton paid the San Antonio, Uvalde and Gulf Railroad to build a depot on her land. Tips organized a townsite company and sold land for the township. On July 4, 1913 the town began with a grand opening and first sale of land.  From its formation, it was designed as a segregated township, with the "Mexican" section located between the river and the railroad tracks, west of the business section.  This can still be seen today in the differences of street names, even though forced segregation ended many decades past.

The city is named for its proximity to three rivers, the Atascosa River, the Frio River, and the Nueces River (the Atascosa joins the Frio north of the city, while the Frio joins the Nueces south of the city).  Originally named Hamiltonburg, the city name was changed when mail meant for the city was accidentally delivered to Hamilton, Texas instead.  Tips suggested the town be named for its location near the rivers, and Three Rivers was approved as the new name by the post office department on May 1, 1914.  Three Rivers was incorporated in 1926 and operates under the general-law aldermanic form of government. In 1925 its population was estimated at 1,000, in 1931 at 1,275, and in 1965 at 1,932, with seventy businesses.

In 1920 natural gas was discovered near Three Rivers and was piped into town and a small refinery was built.  The first glass factory in Texas was built at Three Rivers in 1922 as the gas fuel and local sand was plentiful.  The onset of the Great Depression forced the sale of the factory to the Ball Glass Company in 1937, and the factory was permanently closed in 1938.  The small refinery, however, expanded over time to become a major Diamond Shamrock refinery by 1990 and still is a major employer in the town to this day.

In 1948–1949 the city of Three Rivers gained notoriety as the location of what has become known as the "Longoria Affair" when the director of the only funeral home in town refused to allow chapel services in 1948 for the body of a "Mexican-American" Soldier killed during World War II in 1945.  The installation of a Texas Historical Marker at the site of the funeral home came with controversy. The new owners of the property asked that the marker not be returned after it was repaired, so it was rededicated and installed in the town square at the entrance to city hall.

Geography

Three Rivers is located at  (28.467155, –98.179451).

Climate

The climate in this area is characterized by hot, humid summers and generally mild to cool winters.  According to the Köppen Climate Classification system, Three Rivers has a humid subtropical climate, abbreviated "Cfa" on climate maps.

Demographics

2020 census

As of the 2020 United States census, there were 1,474 people, 651 households, and 506 families residing in the city.

2000 census
As of the census of 2000, there were 1,878 people, 704 households, and 492 families residing in the city. The population density was 1,299.7 people per square mile (503.5/km2). There were 876 housing units at an average density of 606.2/sq mi (234.9/km2). The racial makeup of the city was 82.22% White, 0.53% African American, 0.32% Native American, 0.48% Asian, 14.00% from other races, and 2.45% from two or more races. Hispanic or Latino of any race were 50.37% of the population.

There were 704 households, out of which 36.9% had children under the age of 18 living with them, 53.1% were married couples living together, 12.5% had a female householder with no husband present, and 30.0% were non-families. 26.4% of all households were made up of individuals, and 13.4% had someone living alone who was 65 years of age or older. The average household size was 2.61 and the average family size was 3.18.

In the city, the population was spread out, with 28.1% under the age of 18, 9.0% from 18 to 24, 27.3% from 25 to 44, 21.1% from 45 to 64, and 14.6% who were 65 years of age or older. The median age was 36 years. For every 100 females, there were 90.3 males. For every 100 females age 18 and over, there were 88.4 males.

The median income for a household in the city was $27,188, and the median income for a family was $34,188. Males had a median income of $30,337 versus $16,607 for females. The per capita income for the city was $12,814. About 21.6% of families and 23.3% of the population were below the poverty line, including 28.0% of those under age 18 and 24.8% of those age 65 or over.

Economic base

The predominant economic drivers for Three Rivers, Texas, are oil and gas exploration, refining, ranching, and hunting. Tourism is on the rise due to the gateway to the Choke Canyon Reservoir through Three Rivers. Choke Canyon State Park offers boating, fishing, camping, educational services, and wildlife viewing. The bird migratory routes bring over two hundred different species to the Three Rivers area, making it a national destination for bird watching. Accommodations for visitors are plentiful with hotels and many RV (recreational vehicle) parks. Many of these were built to accommodate workers during the recent Eagle Ford oil boom.

Three Rivers is also the site of the historic first glass factory in the State of Texas. Although it is no longer in production and the building has been demolished, a state historical marker stands at its site. Some of the antique shops in town and in the neighboring county seat of George West may sometimes carry a few pieces the factory produced.

Many Three Rivers residents live in or near Three Rivers because of the large number of jobs needed in the nearby Federal Bureau of Prisons located roughly 10 miles west of town, on Hwy 72. The Valero Three Rivers Refinery located inside the city limits, is another major employer. With the recent 'fracking' surge in the area, Three Rivers is centrally located in the middle of a large field that extends over a three county area.

Government and infrastructure
The United States Postal Service operates the Three Rivers Post Office.

The Federal Bureau of Prisons Federal Correctional Institution, Three Rivers is located in unincorporated Live Oak County, near Three Rivers.

Schools
There is a single school district for the entire city, Three Rivers Independent School District, containing Three Rivers Elementary School, Three Rivers Junior High School and Three Rivers High School.

Notable people

 James Crumley, novelist
 Roy Head, musician
 Felix Z. Longoria Jr., Mexican-American private, died during World War II

References

External links

 
 
 

Cities in Live Oak County, Texas
Cities in Texas
Populated places established in 1913
1913 establishments in Texas